William Bebb (December 8, 1802October 23, 1873) was a Whig politician from Ohio. He served as the 19th governor of Ohio from 1846 to 1849 and was the third native Ohioan to be elected to the office.

Biography
Bebb was born in what was then Hamilton County in the Northwest Territory (his birthplace is now located in modern-day Butler County, Ohio) to Welsh immigrants. He is the son of Edward Bebb and Margaret Roberts Owens. Bebb's parents were early residents of Paddy's Run, now known as Shandon, Ohio. In 1826 the Paddy's Run school was organized under the new state law, a new building was erected, and William Bebb was employed as the first teacher.

On October 16, 1824 he married Sarah Shuck. In 1828, Bebb and his wife opened a boarding school for boys called the "Sycamore Grove School". While he taught school, Bebb studied for the bar and passed the state bar examination. He began practicing law in 1831 and worked in the office of John Woods.

Career
Bebb was a devoted campaigner for William Henry Harrison in 1840, and for Henry Clay in 1844. Bebb was a Presidential elector in 1844 for Clay/Frelinghuysen.

Bebb was nominated by the Whigs in 1846 for the governorship, and served a single term beginning in December 1846. His term technically expired in December 1848, but was extended into January 1849 due to a number of close statewide elections which necessitated delaying the inauguration of a successor.

He was appointed by President Abraham Lincoln as examiner in the pension office at Washington, D.C. He declined an appointment as United States Diplomat to Tangier, Morocco in 1868.

Death
After Bebb retired from politics, he and his wife moved to their farm in Rockford, Illinois. Bebb died at his home on October 23, 1873, and Sarah Bebb died on January 10, 1892.

Bebb was interred in Greenwood Cemetery in Rockford, Illinois.

Trial of William Bebb

In 1857, Bebb fired a weapon and a man died. He was accused of manslaughter, and tried in Winnebago County, Illinois Circuit Court in 1858. One of his defense council summarized the case thus: 

A fable grew out of the trial, which had Tom Corwin coming to the county anonymously before the trial, and charming its occupants to the point that, when he represented Bebb, his good will with the residents assured an acquittal. A later examination of the trial record showed the story to be fanciful, with Corwin and Johnston winning acquittal through competent representation.

References

External links
 Ohio Historical Society, Life of William Bebb
 

 

1802 births
1873 deaths
Governors of Ohio
Ohio Whigs
People from Butler County, Ohio
1844 United States presidential electors
Ohio lawyers
People from Rockford, Illinois
Whig Party state governors of the United States
19th-century American politicians
People acquitted of manslaughter
19th-century American lawyers